The South African Radio League (SARL), formerly known as the South African Radio Relay League (SARRL), is a non-profit organisation representing the interests of amateur radio enthusiasts in South Africa. The SARL advocates on behalf of its membership and all licensed amateur radio operators in South Africa as the representative of amateur radio to the South African government. This has included the promotion of deregulation and simplification of the amateur radio service, and expansion of the number of amateur radio operators in Southern Africa. The SARL publicises and promotes the role of amateur radio in society, and promotes the use of amateur radio in schools as an entry point into the fields of science and technology. The SARL publishes a magazine called Radio ZS twelve times a year. SARL is the national Member Society representing South Africa in the International Amateur Radio Union and is a Member Society in IARU Region 1.

History 

The South African Radio Relay League (SARRL) was formed in 1925 through the efforts of a number of regional and local radio societies and clubs, some of which were established around the time of the First World War. At the outset, membership was limited to licensed radio experimenters capable of two-way telegraphic communication by radio. Temporary headquarters for the organisation were established at Johannesburg. The first president to be elected was Joseph White, who had earlier been the chairman of the Transvaal Radio Society.

A detailed history of the first two years of the SARRL is hard to trace because there was no regular publication of any sort. The first effort in this direction was made some time during 1927, when a fortnightly news sheet appeared under the name "F.O. News." This publication continued for about a year, but no surviving copies exist in SARL records.  "QTC" was the first printed magazine issued by the organisation. The first issue was published in May 1928. The editor was R. S. Perry, A9Z and the magazine was printed in Durban.

Purpose 
The objective of the SARL is to encourage, develop and promote all activities connected with Amateur Radio, wireless communications, computer science and radio science generally. The role of the SARL is to protect amateur radio frequency allocations, to promote international goodwill and understanding. The SARL also promote recognition for amateur radio in all spheres of society in South Africa. HAMNET is a division of the SARL that provide emergency communications in times of disaster by means of amateur radio.

Membership 
Membership of the SARL is open to any person interested in amateur radio. Citizenship of, or residence in, South Africa is not a requirement. Unlicensed members are called "Listeners" and do not have a vote at the Annual General Meeting or any other meetings of the League. Clubs and special interest groups can become affiliated with the SARL but also do not have a vote, only individual full members do.

Services to members 
The SARL web site provides an online marketplace for members to trade radio and related equipment. Members also have access to a database of assigned South African radio amateur call signs. The SARL offers South African hams an online QSL system to capture and confirm local contacts with fellow radio amateurs. The organisation offers frequent amateur radio licence examination opportunities for people interested in obtaining their amateur radio licence. The SARL encourages the full range of amateur radio service activities and facilitates reciprocal and guest licensing.

Radio ZS

Radio ZS is a membership journal that is included in membership with the SARL. The magazine is currently published electronically twelve times a year and issued on the last day of each month for the next month. The magazine is based in Bloemfontein.

The name of the magazine is derived from the radio call sign prefix block assigned to South Africa by the International Telecommunication Union. Most South African amateur radio operators have call signs that begin with the letters ZS. The other call sign prefixes are ZR, ZT and ZU.

Regulatory advocacy 
The SARL provides members with a channel for negotiation with the South African regulatory authority for telecommunications, the Independent Communications Authority of South Africa (ICASA). The SARL also gives members the advantage of collective representation and control in all matters affecting amateur radio. The SARL promotes and negotiates a legal and regulatory environment that acknowledges and permits the Amateur Radio Service. The SARL also advocates for access to all amateur radio bands allocated by the International Telecommunication Union (ITU) radio regulations.

Scientific and educational collaboration with other organisations 

The League participates in an ionospheric research project led by the Hermanus Magnetic Observatory(HMO). The project is to study radio propagation in the 40-m band in the ionosphere.

The project entails a number of 40 milliwatt beacon transmitters at a frequency of 7.023 MHz being operated by amateurs across the country. Propagation data from these beacons is then analysed by scientists at the HMO to reveal details about the structure and behaviour of the ionosphere.

Reception data is collected from reports by other amateurs all over the country. A further educational component of the project is participation by schools.

School children equipped with sponsored simple receivers developed by the SARL, also participate in the project and send reception reports to the HMO. The receivers, supplied in kit form, provide a further educational opportunity as the children will assemble and install them with assistance from local amateur radio clubs. A fun element of the project for the learners is when schools compete to be the first to decode the "secret messages" that some of the beacons transmit.

According to Dr Lee-Anne McKinnell, the HMO Space Physics Group manager, "This project is truly a collaborative project. It will benefit the scientists, the hobbyists, and the schools".

The project stalled soon after launch due to problems co-ordinating the timing of the transmitters.

Satellite projects 

Through its affiliate, AMSAT SA, the League has participated in two amateur radio satellite projects; SUNSAT in collaboration with Stellenbosch University's department of electronic engineering and Sumbandila which is a SunSpace project.
AMSAT SA started a Cubesat programme during 2011.

References

External links 
 South African Radio League official web site

South Africa
Clubs and societies in South Africa
Organizations established in 1925
Telecommunications in South Africa
1925 establishments in South Africa
Organisations based in Johannesburg